Charles Gunn may refer to:

 Charles Gunn (actor) (1883–1918), American film actor in The Sign of the Four
 Charles Gunn (athlete) (1885–1983), British athlete and Olympic medalist
 Charles A. Gunn (1870–?), American architect
 Charles Gunn (Angel), fictional character from the TV series Angel